The 1932 Estonian Football Championship was the 12th official football league season in Estonia. Six teams, four from Tallinn and two from Narva, took part in the league. Each team played every opponent twice, one at home and once on the road, for total of 10 games. VS Sport Tallinn successfully defended their title, winning the league for the eight time in the club's history.

League table

Results

Top scorers

References

Estonian Football Championship
1
Estonia
Estonia